Paramulona nephelistis is a moth of the subfamily Arctiinae first described by George Hampson in 1905. It is found on Cuba.

References

Lithosiini
Endemic fauna of Cuba